A.F.C.A may refer to:

 A.F.C.A (clothing)
 A.F.C.A (hooligans)